Mount Sikaram (Pashto, Dari) is a mountain on the Afghanistan–Pakistan border, south of the Kabul River and Khyber Pass. At , it is the highest peak of the Spīn Ghar, or Safēd Kōh, mountain range.

Location 

Mount Sikaram is located north of the village of Peshawar in the Kurram District of Pakistan’s Khyber Pakhtunkhwa province. Its parent range, Spīn Ghar connects directly with the Shandūr offshoot of the Hindu Kush mountain system. Atop the range, temperatures can fall below  at any time of the year.

A small valley on the slope of Mount Sikaram encompasses a number of villages, districts, and tribal regions—many historically significant—including Peiwar, Alizai, Tari Mangal, Narai, Speena Shaga, and Khewas. The Gawi Pass, also known as the Peiwar Kotal Pass, runs between the Kurram Valley and Afghanistan's Aryub Valley; it connects the Paktia Province of Afghanistan with the Kurram District of Khyber Pakhtunkhwa province in the Ex Federally Administered Tribal Areas of Pakistan.

History
 1878 British forces were victorious over Afghan forces and seized control of the Peiwar Pass in the Battle of Peiwar Kotal.
 1878-1879 British surveyor George Batley Scott climbed the mountain during a campaign to survey Afghanistan.

See also
 Hindukush
 Mountain ranges of Pakistan
 List of Mountains in Pakistan
 List of mountain ranges of the world
 List of Ultras of the Karakoram and Hindu Kush

References

Sikaram
Sikaram
Afghanistan–Pakistan border
Sikaram
Landforms of Paktia Province
Four-thousanders of the Hindu Kush